Wat Tanlom is a Buddhist monastery located at Mueang Subdistrict, Mueang District, Chonburi, Thailand.

Buddhist temples in Chonburi Province